Burning Love is a 2015 mockumentary comedy film written and directed by Alberto Caviglia. It premiered in the Horizons section at the 72nd Venice International Film Festival.

Plot 
In July 2006, the major television news channels reported the death of Leonardo Zuliani. In Rome, a large group of followers gathers in front of the young activist's birthplace in Trastevere. The mother is desperate, the neighborhood paralyzed and all the authorities express their solidarity with the family while a large demonstration is held in her honor.

An important detail is that what makes Leonardo a national hero is his being anti-Semitic.

Cast 

  Davide Giordano as Leonardo
  Anna Ferruzzo as  Leonardo's Mother
 Omero Antonutti as  Leonardo's Grandfather
 Francesco Pannofino as Leonardo's Father
  Bianca Nappi as  Leonardo's Sister
  Mimosa Campironi as  Sofia
  Alberto Di Stasio as  Psychiatrist
 Lorenza Indovina as  Leonardo's Teacher
  Francesco Russo  as  Guglielmo
  Niccolò Senni as  Mario
 Paola Minaccioni as  President of AILA
  Marco Ripoldi as Antonio Persica 
  Massimiliano Gallo as  Don Ciro
 Vinicio Marchioni as Fictional Leonardo  in the Movie  
 Carolina Crescentini as  Fictional Sofia in the Movie  
 Margherita Buy as  Fictional Leonardo's Mother in the Movie  
  Tommaso Mercuri as Leonardo as a Child

See also 
 List of Italian films of 2015

References

External links 
 

2015 films
2010s mockumentary films
Italian mockumentary films
2015 directorial debut films
2010s Italian-language films
2010s Italian films